Black Ops Entertainment was an American mobile app developer and former video game developer located in Santa Monica, California. From 1994 to 2006, it developed sixteen games for several platforms, including the PlayStation, Nintendo 64, PlayStation 2, GameCube, and Xbox. In the years since then it has primarily developed apps for iOS and Android.

History

The company was founded by four MIT graduates in 1994, who developed a SNES Volleyball prototype. Virgin Games contracted them to produce Agile Warrior, which necessitated recruiting a larger team. Initially developing out of their homes, the studio later established their Santa Monica office.

Black Ops became known for their line of sports titles, including their contributions to the NCAA Basketball series. The developer received an AIAS award in 2000, with Knockout Kings 2000 winning console sports game of the year. In the early 2000s, Black Ops released two street basketball titles; Street Hoops and AND 1 Streetball. The decision to move to street basketball as opposed to continuing with NCAA came from a desire to be able to develop "unique play styles with no rules", and avoid the need for permission from the NCAA. The team size peaked at 30 developers during the development of Street Hoops in 2002.

The video game studio shut down in 2006, though John Botti continued producing iOS and Android apps under the moniker such as iTraderPro (2011) and aiTrader (2019).

Titles

Games

Apps
ITrader Pro (2011)
Avattire (2014)
Californiageddon (2017)
Ace Driver (2018)
aiTrader (2019)

References

External links
 Blackops.com: Black Ops Entertainment games
GameSpot company entry — (archived)

Video game companies based in California
Video game development companies
Companies based in Santa Monica, California
Video game companies established in 1994
1994 establishments in California